Natalia Medvedeva and Larisa Savchenko were the defending champions but only Savchenko competed that year with Helena Suková.

Savchenko and Suková lost in the semifinals to Arantxa Sánchez Vicario and Natasha Zvereva.

Sánchez Vicario and Zvereva won the final 5–3 after Yayuk Basuki and Caroline Vis were defaulted.

Seeds
Champion seeds are indicated in bold text while text in italics indicates the round in which those seeds were eliminated.

Draw

External links
 1997 Kremlin Cup Women's Doubles Draw

Kremlin Cup
Kremlin Cup